The 1889–90 season was Preston's 2nd season in professional football. The club entered the season as double defending champions, having won both the league and FA Cup titles the previous season. Although the Bolton Wanderers removed them from the cup, a successive league title was assured on the final day. With the Lilywhites holding off the challenges of Everton and the Blackburn Rovers.

Final league table

Results

Football League

FA Cup

Players
Preston's squad for the 1889–90 season.

References

Preston North End F.C. seasons
Preston North End
English football championship-winning seasons